KIBM (1490 AM) is an oldies formatted broadcast radio station licensed to Omaha, Nebraska, serving the Omaha–Council Bluffs metropolitan area. KIBM is owned and operated by Steven Seline, through licensee Walnut Radio, LLC. KIBM's transmitter is located near South 32nd Avenue and Vinton Street in the Hanscom Park neighborhood near Downtown Omaha.

History
KIBM signed on in 1942 as KBON. It changed to KLNG on July 1, 1970. By early 1977, KLNG identified as "Newsradio 149". However, on June 1 of that year, KLNG became KYNN and took on a country music format. On April 9, 1985, at 6 a.m., the station flipped to oldies as KEDS. Due to poor ratings, on July 2, 1987, KEDS dropped the oldies format and began simulcasting KEZO-FM. The simulcast would last until the early 1990s, when KEZO flipped to sports talk (the first station of its kind in the Omaha market), and would adopt the KOSR call letters in March 1996. The sports format would last until April 25, 2005, when then-sister station KOMJ (590 AM) swapped formats, with 1490 adopting KOMJ's adult standards format and call letters.

Journal Broadcast Group sold the station to Cochise Radio Partners in 2007, and the intention was for KOMJ's studios to be relocated. But on August 1, 2013, an FCC agent attempted to inspect the studios of KOMJ. The on-file address, 10714 Mockingbird Drive, is the studio for Journal's television station, KMTV-TV and their then-radio sisters, and had never been changed, despite Cochise's full relocation of the station; Journal did not lease a studio out to Cochise as part of the sale. Less than a year later, in March 2014, the FCC fined Cochise $17,000, citing with KOMJ's failure to maintain access to their public file (which Journal also did not have on hand) as part of the studio address violation.

On October 17, 2014, Cochise announced the sale of KOMJ to Walnut Radio, LLC for $450,000. The sale between Cochise and Walnut closed on January 2, 2015. Five days later, the station dropped the middle of the road music from its format for adult standards, classic hits, and oldies.

At exactly 6:00 p.m. on January 7, "Boomer 1490" (a nod to baby boomers, its core demographic) was officially launched with a live listening party at Gorat's Steakhouse in Omaha. The first song played under the new Boomer format was "Good Vibrations" by The Beach Boys. In June of that year, long time radio legend Dave Wingert became the new Morning Show host. In May 2016, an FM translator was added on 104.1 FM, giving the station an AM/FM combo. The station is now known as "Boomer Radio."

The call letters were changed to KOBM on December 11, 2018. On April 1, 2019, the station changed call letters to KIBM, with the KOBM call letters moving to 1420 AM (the former KOTK).

Translator
In addition to the main station, KIBM is relayed by An FM translator in the core Omaha metro and suburbs.

References

External links
Boomer 104.1 and 1490 Online

FCC History Cards for KIBM

1942 establishments in Nebraska
Oldies radio stations in the United States
Radio stations established in 1942
IBM